Fred Mannering is an American scientist/engineer who is most known for the development and application of statistical and econometric methods to study highway safety, economics, travel behavior, and a variety of engineering-related problems.

Early life and education 
Mannering was born in 1954 (November) in Pittsburgh, Pennsylvania. He graduated from suburban Pittsburgh's South Fayette High School, received his B.S. degree from the University of Saskatchewan, M.S. degree from Purdue University, and Ph.D. from the Massachusetts Institute of Technology where his doctoral committee consisted of Clifford Winston (advisor), Daniel McFadden (2000 Nobel Prize laureate in Economics) and Ann Fetter Friedlaender.

Career 
Mannering is currently a Professor of Civil and Environmental Engineering (with a courtesy appointment in Economics) and Executive Director of the Center for Urban Transportation Research at the University of South Florida. He previously held academic positions as Head of Civil Engineering and later as the Charles Pankow Professor at Purdue University. Prior to joining Purdue University, he was a Professor and Chair of Civil and Environmental Engineering at the University of Washington and an Assistant Professor at the Pennsylvania State University.

Mannering has received numerous awards in his discipline. In 2005 he won the Wilbur S. Smith Award, and in 2009 the James Laurie Prize  for his work in highway safety (both awarded by the American Society of Civil Engineers). He received the Murphy Teaching Award, Purdue University's highest undergraduate teaching honor, in 2013. In 2016, he was named by the Eno Foundation as one of the Top 10 Transportation Thought Leaders in  Academia and in 2019, his paper on highway accident frequency was recognized by the American Society of Civil Engineers as one of four Journal of Transportation Engineering Part A: Systems papers that have been instrumental in moving civil engineering forward or have changed the practice of transportation engineering, infrastructure, and development.  In 2020, Mannering was recognized as the most highly-cited author (highest total citations and citations per paper) in the 50-year history of the journal Accident Analysis and Prevention and in 2021 he received the Council of University Transportation Centers (HNTB-CUTC) Lifetime Achievement Award. For four consecutive years (2019 to 2022 inclusive), Mannering was on Clarivate's annual list of the world's most influential researchers of the past decade, who were recognized for writing multiple highly cited papers that rank in the top 1% by citations for field and year in Web of Science.

Research 
Mannering is known for his work in highway safety, statistics, and econometrics. He has published extensively with over 150 journal articles. Some of his most impactful work includes research on highway accident frequency and injury severity, the effects of unobserved heterogeneity in highway safety analysis, and his work on temporal instability in the analysis of highway accident data. He has contributed to the advancement of science and engineering through his teaching and as an author of two widely adopted textbooks: Principles of Highway Engineering and Traffic Analysis and Statistical and Econometric Methods for Transportation Data Analysis. Mannering is Editor-in-Chief (and founding Editor) of the journal Analytic Methods in Accident Research and past Editor-in-Chief and current Distinguished Editorial Board Member of the journal Transportation Research Part B - Methodological.

Books 

 Mannering,  F.,  Washburn, S., (2020). Principles of highway engineering and traffic analysis (7th edition, ©2020).
 Washington, S., Karlaftis, M., Mannering, F., Anastasopoulos, P., (2020). Statistical and econometric methods for transportation data analysis (3rd edition, ©2020)

Selected and most cited publications 

 Mannering, F., Bhat, C., Shankar, V.,  Abdel-Aty, M, 2020. Big data, traditional data and the trade-offs between prediction and causality in highway-safety analysis. Analytic Methods in Accident Research 25, 100113. 
Mannering, F., 2018. Temporal instability and the analysis of highway accident data. Analytic Methods in Accident Research 17, pp. 1–13. 
Mannering, F., Shankar, V., Bhat, C., 2016. Unobserved heterogeneity and the statistical analysis of highway accident data. Analytic Methods in Accident Research 11, pp. 1–16.
 Mannering, F., Bhat, C., 2014. Analytic methods in accident research: Methodological frontier and future directions. Analytic Methods in Accident Research 1, pp. 1–22.
 Savolainen, P., Mannering, F., Lord, D, Quddus, M., 2011. The statistical analysis of highway crash-injury severities: A review and assessment of methodological alternatives. Accident Analysis and Prevention 43(5), pp. 1666–1676.
 Lord, D., Mannering, F., 2010. The statistical analysis of crash-frequency data: A review and assessment of methodological alternatives. Transportation Research Part A: Policy and Practice, 44(5), pp. 291–305.
 Anastasopoulos, P., Mannering, F., 2009. A note on modeling vehicle accident frequencies with random-parameters count models. Accident Analysis and Prevention 41(1), pp. 153–159.
 Milton, J., Shankar, V., Mannering, F., 2008. Highway accident severities and the mixed logit model: An exploratory empirical analysis. Accident Analysis and Prevention 40(1), pp. 260–266.
Poch, M., Mannering, F., 1996. Negative binomial analysis of intersection-accident frequencies. Journal of Transportation Engineering 122(2), pp. 105–113.
Mannering, F., Winston, C., 1985. A dynamic empirical analysis of household vehicle ownership and utilization. Rand Journal of Economics 16(2), pp. 215–236.

References 

American scientists
1954 births
Living people

External links 
 Fred Mannering's Homepage
Fred Mannering Good Morning America Interview
Fred Mannering Google Scholar
American civil engineers